Lobo Chan (born 15 October 1960) is a British actor and opera singer, perhaps best known for his role in Peter Jackson's 2005 remake of King Kong.

Filmography
King Kong (2005) - Choy
The Broken (2008) - Harry Lee
Johnny English Reborn (2011) - Xiang Ping
Cabin Pressure (Radio; 2013) - Chinese ATC
Peaky Blinders (2013) - Mr Zhang
My Best Friend's Wedding (2016) - Mr Meng
Killing Eve (TV; 2018) - Jin Yeong
Spitting Image (TV; 2020) - Xi Jinping
''Thomas & Friends: All Engines Go! (TV; 2022) - Yong Bao (UK)

References

External links

1960 births
British people of Chinese descent
21st-century British male opera singers
British male film actors
Living people
21st-century British male actors
British male television actors
British male voice actors